Svend Frømming (August 15, 1918 – April 7, 1979) was a Danish sprint canoer who competed in the 1950s. He won a silver medal in the K-2 10000 m event at the 1950 ICF Canoe Sprint World Championships in Copenhagen.

Frømming also competed in two Summer Olympics, earning his best finish of seventh in the K-1 10000 m event at Melbourne in 1956.

References

Sports-reference.com profile

1918 births
1979 deaths
Canoeists at the 1952 Summer Olympics
Canoeists at the 1956 Summer Olympics
Danish male canoeists
Olympic canoeists of Denmark
ICF Canoe Sprint World Championships medalists in kayak